Biswamoyopterus is a genus of rodent in the family Sciuridae. It contains three known species of very large flying squirrels, with B. laoensis being among the longest of all squirrels. They are distributed in forests in northeast India, southwest China and Laos. Despite their size, species in this genus tend to be very elusive; due to this, all of them have been described relatively recently. Additionally, they are easily confused with certain Petaurista giant flying squirrels that are more common and overlap in range with the rare Biswamoyopterus.

Species 
There are currently three known species in this genus:

 Namdapha flying squirrel Biswamoyopterus biswasi
 Mount Gaoligong flying squirrel Biswamoyopterus gaoligongensis
 Laotian giant flying squirrel Biswamoyopterus laoensis

Recent studies have suggested that the three known species are in fact one species. It was based on the Morphological comparisons, where the three species shared nearly similar morphologies.

References 

Biswamoyopterus
Rodent genera